John Henry de Villiers, 1st Baron de Villiers,  (15 June 1842 – 2 September 1914) was a Cape lawyer and judge. He was Attorney-General in the Molteno Government, Chief Justice for the Cape Colony, and later the first Chief Justice for the Union of South Africa. As the country's most senior judge for 40 of its formative years, De Villiers is often considered the most influential judge in South African history.

Early life and legal career

John de Villiers was the son of Charles Christian de Villiers, of Paarl, Cape of Good Hope, and his wife Dorothea Retief. His family was of French Huguenot descent and had arrived in the Cape four generations before in 1689.

His father's dying wish had been that he become a minister in the Dutch Reformed Church, however after 18 months study he found that he had no true calling to the church, and switched to studying law. He studied in Berlin and London (where he read law at the Inner Temple), was called to the English bar in 1865 and the Cape bar the next year. William Porter, the Attorney General at the time, became his legal mentor and soon afterwards he entered parliament representing Worcester.

In parliament, he and Porter supported John Molteno's movement for responsible government in 1872, even helping to draft the bill that secured it.

Attorney-General of the Cape Colony (1872–1874)

In November 1872, after the Cape successfully attained self-government, the country's unpopular Attorney General William Griffith was retired. 

John de Villiers was called upon to replace him as Attorney-General of the Cape Colony in Molteno's cabinet. He served for only two years, from 1872 to 1874.

He was thus the first Attorney-General of the Cape under responsible government. At the time it was still legal to have a private practice, and de Villiers did so. However this work in addition to his work as legal adviser to the government and drafting parliamentary bills put severe strain on his health.

Chief Justice (1874–1914)

In 1874, on Molteno's insistence, he agreed to take the office of Chief Justice of the Cape Colony - a job he performed with great dedication and skill until the Act of Union in 1910. After the Union of South Africa was created, he went on to serve as Chief Justice of South Africa from 1910 to 1914.

Altogether, he served as Chief Justice for 40 years, with "an ever-growing reputation of the highest character for independence, legal ability, and irreproachable impartiality." Although he had represented Worcester in Parliament and was very much interested in politics, John de Villiers chose not to pursue political power any further. His reserved and sensitive personality, together with a weak physical constitution and his lack of outward charisma, made him ill-suited to the rough world of politics. However his academic ability, progressive thinking, huge range of intellectual interests and driving work ethic served to make him peerless in the judiciary.

Titles and later life

In 1877, he was knighted, and in 1882, he was appointed Knight Commander of the Order of St Michael and St George (KCMG). He was admitted to the Privy Council of the United Kingdom in 1897, and in 1910 he was raised to the peerage as Baron de Villiers, of Wynberg in the Province of the Cape of Good Hope and the Union of South Africa. 

Lord de Villiers married Aletta Johanna, daughter of Jan Pieter Jordaan, in 1871. He died in September 1914, aged 72, and was succeeded in the barony by his son Charles Percy de Villiers. Lady de Villiers died in 1922.

Notes

References

Kidd, Charles, Williamson, David (editors). Debrett's Peerage and Baronetage (1990 edition). New York: St Martin's Press, 1990, 

|-

|-

1842 births
1914 deaths
19th-century South African judges
19th-century South African lawyers
20th-century South African judges
Afrikaner people
Attorneys General of the Cape Colony
Barons created by George V
Barons in the Peerage of the United Kingdom
Cape Colony judges
Chief justices of South Africa
Huguenots
Members of the Judicial Committee of the Privy Council
South African Freemasons
South African Knights Bachelor
South African Knights Commander of the Order of St Michael and St George
South African members of the Privy Council of the United Kingdom
South African people of French descent